Andrew Tarpey (born 25 July 1965) is a former Australian rules footballer who played with Collingwood in the Victorian/Australian Football League (VFL/AFL).

Tarpey joined Collingwood in mid-1988 from Oakleigh District, where he played with his brother Howard, after recovering from ACL Reconstruction back in 1986

Tarpey didn't play many senior games for Collingwood and only scored one goal, but he did contribute at the reserves level, winning the Joseph Wren Memorial Trophy in 1989.

After leaving Collingwood, at the end of 1991, he joined Sandringham in the Victorian Football League (VFL), winning with them the 1992 premiership. He had been drafted by the Richmond Football Club in the 1992 Mid-Season Draft, but opted to stay with Sandringham and did not play any senior games for Richmond.

Tarpey joined Smithton as a captain coach in 1993. After that he returned to Sandringham in 1994, winning another premiership with the club. In 1995 he only played 3 games before succumbing to injury.

In 1996, Tarpey played for Clayton in the Southern Football League (SFL).

References

External links
 

1965 births
Australian rules footballers from Victoria (Australia)
Collingwood Football Club players
Sandringham Football Club players
Living people